Afternoon is that time of day from 1:00 PM to 4:00 PM

Afternoon may also refer to:

Afternoon (magazine), a Japanese manga magazine published by Kodansha
Afternoon (newspaper), a newspaper published in Mumbai, India
Afternoon (play), an 1883 play by Ouida
Afternoon, a 1965 film directed by Andy Warhol
Afternoon, a 2015 film directed by Tsai Ming-liang
Afternoon, a story, a hypertext novel by Michael Joyce
Afternoon (EP), an EP by Mae
Afternoons (band)